An ancient settlement situated on the end of Cape of St. Athanasius (also known as Sveti Anastas) near Byala, Varna Province, Bulgaria, has been partially restored by archaeologists. The visible remains date mainly from end of the 6th century AD.

The settlement dates back to the Chalcolithic and was occupied through the Eneolithic. Roman ruins from the 2nd–3rd century AD and Thracian religious buildings from the 6th–5th century BC are also present.

References

Ancient Greek archaeological sites in Bulgaria
Roman towns and cities in Bulgaria
History of Varna Province